Vivan Anderson Moultrie Playground was created in the early 1970s to mitigate the effects of I-26's routing across the peninsula of Charleston, South Carolina, United States. After the elevated interstate was completed, a sandbox and play equipment were installed under the roadway. The new recreation area was known as Linear Park. In 2000, the City of Charleston improved the playground and renamed it in honor of a longtime resident.

Notes

Parks in Charleston, South Carolina